Fabián Blengino is an Argentine tennis coach and former professional player.

Blengino had a career best singles ranking of 370 in his playing career and won an ATP Challenger title in doubles. 

Since 1995 he has been a tennis coach and runs the Blengino Academy in his native Buenos Aires. He has coached numerous players on the ATP Tour including Guillermo Coria, who he helped reach the 2004 French Open final.

ATP Challenger titles

Doubles: (1)

References

External links
 
 

Year of birth missing (living people)
Living people
Argentine male tennis players
Argentine tennis coaches
Tennis players from Buenos Aires